Electrocuting an Elephant (also known as Electrocution of an Elephant) is a 1903 American, short, black-and-white, silent documentary film of the killing of the elephant Topsy by electrocution at a Coney Island amusement park. It was produced by the Edison film company (part of the Edison Manufacturing Company) and is believed to have been shot by Edwin S. Porter or Jacob Blair Smith.

Synopsis
This film documents the publicly announced killing of Topsy the elephant at the unfinished Luna Park on Coney Island, New York City on January 4, 1903. The elephant had recently been acquired from Forepaugh Circus, where she had a reputation as a "bad" elephant, having killed a drunken spectator the previous year who burnt the tip of her trunk with a lit cigar. After several incidents at Luna Park (sometimes attributed to the actions of her handler, William "Whitey" Alt) the owners of Luna Park, Frederic Thompson and Elmer "Skip" Dundy, claimed they could no longer handle the elephant and announced they would hang Topsy in a public spectacle and charge admission. The American Society for the Prevention of Cruelty to Animals stepped in, questioning the idea of hanging an elephant as well as making a public spectacle out of the death of an animal. Thompson and Dundy cut the event back to invited guest and press only and agreed to use a surer method of strangling the elephant with large ropes tied to a steam powered winch. They also agreed they would use poison and electricity as well.

The 74 second film opens with a standard Edison Studios credit screen "ELECTROCUTING AN ELEPHANT" "Thomas A. Edison" and then cuts to Topsy being led past a crowd of people through an unfinished Luna Park to the execution spot, an island in the middle of a "lagoon" used for boat-rides, by elephant handler Carl Goliath. The film camera stops at that point and an intervening hour and forty-five minutes are not recorded. During this unrecorded interval Topsy refused to cross the bridge to the island forcing the park employees and Brooklyn Edison electricians to re-rig the strangling apparatus and electrical wiring to where Topsy stood. Topsy was also fed carrots laced with cyanide while copper-clad sandals connected to electric lines were strapped to her feet. When the film camera restarts, Topsy is seen with the bridge over the lagoon and the original execution spot, the parks "Electric Tower" with a sign advertising "OPENING MAY 2ND 1903 LUNA PARK $1,000,000 EXPOSITION, THE HEART OF CONEY ISLAND", in the background. Topsy tries to shake off one of the sandals and then stands still. At that point she stiffens as 6,600-volts AC is applied to her body. Smoke rises from her feet and then she topples to the ground. Right at the end of the film, the noose tied around Topsy's neck can be seen tightening.

Release
This was one of many short "actuality" films by the Edison Manufacturing Company shot at Coney Island from 1897 on. It was released on January 17, 1903, 13 days after Topsy's death, to be viewed in Edison coin-operated kinetoscopes. It was listed in the Edison catalog as:

Electrocuting an Elephant does not seem to have been as popular as other Edison films from that period.

Place in history
The Edison company submitted the film to the Library of Congress as a "paper print" (a photographic record of each frame of the film) for copyright purposes. This form of submission may have saved the film for posterity since most films and negatives of this period decayed or were destroyed over time. It may have been the first time a death was ever captured in a motion picture film.

The film fell into relative obscurity in the years after 1903, showing up as an out-of-context clip in the 1979 film Mr. Mike's Mondo Video. In 1991, documentary maker Ric Burns made the film Coney Island which included a segment recounting the death of Topsy, including clips from the film Electrocuting an Elephant. The film was also used in a memorial arts piece to commemorate the 100th anniversary of Topsy's death created by New Orleans artist Lee Deigaard and exhibited at the Coney Island USA museum. It allowed the public to view the film on a hand cranked mutoscope while surrounded by hanging chains and standing on a copper plate.

In popular culture, Thompson and Dundy's execution of Topsy has switched attribution, with claims the film depicts an anti-alternating current demonstration organized by Thomas A. Edison during the war of the currents. Historians point out that Edison was never at Luna Park and the electrocution of Topsy took place 10 years after the war of the currents.

See also
 1903 in film

References

External links

 
 "January 4, 1903: Edison Fries an Elephant to Prove His Point" – Wired article about Edison's "macabre form of a series of animal electrocutions using AC".

1903 films
American documentary films
American black-and-white films
American silent short films
Thomas Edison
Documentary films about elephants
Films shot in New York (state)
Articles containing video clips
Edison Manufacturing Company films
Filmed deaths of animals
1900s documentary films
Films set in Coney Island
1900s American films
Silent documentary films